The Vingtaine du Mont à l'Abbé is one of six vingtaines of the Parish of Saint Helier in the Channel Island of Jersey.

Elected Officials
Two Vingteniers, three Constable's Officers and two Roads Inspectors are elected for three years term to represent this Vingtaine.

Current serving Vingteniers are Michel Couriard MBE and Paul Le Lievre.

Roads Inspectors are Edward Lindsey and Darius Pearce.

There are currently three vacancies for Constable's Officers in this Vingtaine.

Along with the Vingtaine du Mont Cochon and the Vingtaine de Haut du Mont au Prêtre it forms District St Helier North and elects 4 Deputies to the States of Jersey.

Mont a L'Abbe
Saint Helier